Total Eclipse is an American metal band from San Francisco, California, with a self-produced mini-CD released internationally (Guardians of Metal, 1999), a worldwide album (Ashes of Eden, Limb Music, 2003) released under a major record label, Spellcaster (Independent, 2009)Kukulkan in the 2013, and now in 2021 the new album Enemy Enemy  has been released independently.

History

In 1996 Erik Cameron and his brother Chris formed the band Total Eclipse. After a search for musicians who shared their passion, they met drummer Ramon Ochoa in 1998. As a teenager, Ramon had already swung the stick for several local acts. A short time later experienced bass player Owen Hart joined the band. The line-up was completed in January 1999 by singer Andy Dracons Giardina - also in Pandemic, and now the only original member from Total Eclipse's old line-up - who had already made a name for himself in his native Italy before moving to the United States to finish his academic studies and advance his musical career.

The chemistry between the Cameron brothers and the rest of the band was just right and within a year they had enough material for a demo. The Total Eclipse Guardians of Metal EP was released internationally in 1999.

Encouraged by the demo's success, Total Eclipse contacted famous German producer Uwe Lulis and before long the band had signed a deal with Limb Music; the album Ashes of Eden was released worldwide to much critical acclaim. Legendary Piet Sielck was also involved in the mixing and production of the album.

In 2004, the original line-up disintegrated following a decision made by the Cameron Brothers to pursue a different musical direction. After parting ways with Limb Music, and having legally acquired the name of the band, Giardina decided to find another label to release their new second album, Spellcaster, also produced by Uwe Lulis, recorded in the Bay Area and somewhere near the Black Forest in Germany, then remastered in 2007/08 in San Francisco. The music is an expansion of the sound of the Ashes of Eden album and the Guardians of Metal demo.

In October 2007, Andy Dracons Giardina decided to resurrect Total Eclipse after the band's four-year hiatus from the scene, and simultaneously release the long-awaited second LP Spellcaster. After many hardships, including a brief stint with a reformed line-up that didn't quite work out, the quest to fulfill the reincarnation of Total Eclipse continued and, in 2008, the band found Brian Davy as the new drummer for the second line-up.

In March 2009 Total Eclipse entered Faultline Studios in San Francisco to begin the recording of the third LP with the new line-up. The title for the new album is Kulkukan and has been recently released worldwide independently. This work represents yet another phase in the evolution of style and sound of the band. With the album recording complete, the band is setting up a full lineup, and will be planning subsequent touring to support the release.

In 2010, Total Eclipse joined world-famous metal band, IMAGIKA on a US tour which ran for several weeks, and was booked by Distilled Entertainment.

In July 2013, Total Eclipse was rejoined by guitarist Dan Gorman, and the band is now rehearsing material and setting plans to move forward.

After his return in Italy, Andy Giardina start to work on the new album "Enemy, Enemy" will be released in March 2021. The new album comprises different styles that exemplify the evolution of the entity known as Total Eclipse and include the roots of metal in all its aspects-
Supported by heavy "sabbath" bass lines forged in the Sabina land by Luciano Mancini, intersects the epic and triumphant atmospheres of the instrumentalist Maurizio Giacchi and the dystopian-psychedelic musical ideas of  Andy Giardina-and its progression based on the Spirit of the Times.

References

Musical groups from San Francisco
Musical groups established in 1996
Heavy metal musical groups from California